The Clarksburg AVA is an American Viticultural Area that spans three counties in California's Sacramento Valley.  Located in portions of Sacramento County, Solano County, and Yolo County, the Clarksburg AVA includes  near the town of Clarksburg.  The growing region has dense clay and loam soils.  Fog and cool breezes from San Francisco Bay keep the Clarksburg area cooler than nearby Sacramento.   90% of the grapes grown in the Clarksburg AVA are crushed in winery facilities located elsewhere in California, and relatively few wines are released with the Clarksburg AVA on their labels.

References 

American Viticultural Areas of California
Geography of Sacramento County, California
Geography of Solano County, California
Geography of Yolo County, California
American Viticultural Areas
1984 establishments in California